Bescanó is a small town in the province of Girona and autonomous community of Catalonia, Spain.

References

External links

 Government data pages 

Municipalities in Gironès